The Arga-Yuryakh (Arğaa Ürex) is a river in Sakha Republic (Yakutia), Russia. It is one of the major tributaries of the Omoloy.

The river flows north of the Arctic Circle, across desolate tundra territories of the East Siberian Lowland. Its basin falls within Ust-Yansky and Bulunsky districts. The name of the river comes from the Yakut "Arğaa-ürex" (Арҕаа-үрэх), meaning "western river".

Course
The Arga-Yuryakh is a left tributary of the Omoloy. The river flows roughly in an ENE direction and when it descends into the East Siberian Lowland, it bends and heads in a NNE direction until the end of its course. In its last stretch the river flows roughly parallel to the Omoloy further east, meandering in the floodplain. Finally the Arga-Yuryakh bends to the east and joins the left bank of the Omoloy  from its mouth.

Tributaries
The river is frozen between early October and early June. There are more than 1,500 lakes in its basin.

See also
List of rivers of Russia

References

External links 
Fishing & Tourism in Yakutia

Tributaries of the Omoloy
Rivers of the Sakha Republic
Verkhoyansk Range
East Siberian Lowland